John Gibbons Adams (23 March 1912 – 26 June 2003) was the US Army's counsel in the Army-McCarthy Hearings. He was an Army veteran of World War II, and he worked in Washington, DC for the Defense Department before he became the US Army general counsel in 1953. From 1953 to 1955 he was the chief legal adviser to Army Secretary Robert T. Stevens.

Publications

References

1932 births
2003 deaths
McCarthyism
General Counsels of the United States Army